Allen Catherine Kagina is a Ugandan administrator and corporate executive. She is the executive director of the Uganda National Roads Authority (UNRA). She was appointed to that position on 27 April 2015. Before that, from 2004 until 2014, she served as the Commissioner General of the Uganda Revenue Authority (URA).

Background and education
She was born in Rukungiri District, Western Region of Uganda, in 1961 to Hezron and Catherine Kakuyo. She studied at Gayaza High School, a prestigious, private, boarding, all-girl middle and high school. She holds a Bachelor of Science degree in psychology obtained from Makerere University, Uganda's oldest and largest public university. She also holds a Master of Public Administration obtained from the University of Liverpool in the United Kingdom. She received a Master of Arts in Organisational Leadership and Management on 30 October 2015 from Uganda Christian University, in Mukono, Uganda.

Work experience
Kagina started her career in 1985 as a teaching assistant at Makerere University. She later moved to the Office of the President. In 1992, she joined the URA as a senior principal revenue officer, serving in that capacity until 1998. In 2000, she was promoted to the rank of deputy commissioner for customs at URA, serving in that capacity until 2001. She was appointed commissioner general of URA in 2004. She is credited with improving the URA's financial performance. She was awarded the Corporate Leadership Award in February 2006, by Destiny Consult, an industry group, for turning around the performance of the tax body since her appointment to head the organization in 2004. In October 2010, her contract was renewed for another three years. Her monthly salary was reported to be UGX:28 million (approximately: US$11,250). On 27 April 2015, John Byabagambi, the Ugandan Minister of Works and Transport at that time, appointed her as the executive director of the UNRA, effective 1 May 2015.

Personal details
Allen Kagina is married to Paul Kagina. Together, they are the parents of three children, Dan, Michelle and Mark. She is a born-again Christian. She is also the sister of Lorna Magara, Jocelyn Kyobutungi Rugunda (wife to Uganda's Prime Minister, Ruhakana Rugunda) as well as Caleb Kakuyo (former Chief Commercial Officer at National Housing and Construction Corporation) among others.

See also
 List of wealthiest people in Uganda
Kampala District
Rukungiri District

References

External links
URA Targets UGX:6.3 Trillion (US$2.7 Billion) Revenue In Financial Year:2011/2012

Living people
1961 births
Alumni of the University of Liverpool
Makerere University alumni
Uganda Christian University alumni
People from Rukungiri District
People from Western Region, Uganda
Ugandan Christians
Ugandan women business executives
Ugandan business executives
Ugandan chief executives
People educated at Gayaza High School
Ugandan women chief executives